Michael J. Schmidt is a United States Air Force lieutenant general who serves as Director of the PEO F-35 Lightning Joint Program Office since July 5, 2022. He most recently served as Director of the C3I Networks Directorate from April 2018 to July 2022. Before that, he was the Director of the Fighters and Bombers Directorate.

References

External links

Year of birth missing (living people)
Living people
Place of birth missing (living people)
United States Air Force generals